Christopher Gebhard (born 1974 or 1975) is a Pennsylvania state senator who represents the 48th district, which includes all of Lebanon County and portions of Dauphin and York counties. He is a member of the Republican Party and the owner of an insurance and risk management firm.

Early life and career
Gebhard was born in 1974/1975 to parents Peter and Lauralee Gebhard. He attended Cedar Crest High School in Lebanon before graduating from The Hill School in Pottstown in 1992. Gebhard earned a Bachelor of Arts degree in psychology from Vanderbilt University in Nashville, after which he returned to Lebanon and began working for his father's insurance agency just after it had merged with a larger company in 1996. Later that year, Gebhard took a job with Cincinnati Insurance Company in Ohio, returning to Hoaster Gebhard in early 2000 but as a "regular employee" per his father. By 2014, Gebhard became the CEO and president of Hoaster Gebhard & Co., an insurance and risk management firm in Lebanon.

Pennsylvania Senate
After Dave Arnold died in January 2021 while serving as state senator from Pennsylvania's 48th district, a special election to fill the position was scheduled for May 18, 2021. Gebhard was chosen by the Lebanon County Republican Committee as the Republican candidate, from a list of eight potential names. Running against three other candidates, he won the special election to complete Arnold's term with 62 percent of the vote. Gebhard was sworn in to office on June 9, 2021, and is running for reelection in 2022 against Democrat Calvin Clements, who was his closest opponent in 2021.

Personal life
Gebhard lives in North Cornwall Township with his wife Sarah and two sons.

He has played golf since he was a teenager, and won most of the major local golf tournaments, including several better ball pairs tournaments.

References

External links
State Senator Chris Gebhard
Chris Gebhard at Ballotpedia

21st-century American politicians
American businesspeople in insurance
People from Lebanon County, Pennsylvania
Republican Party Pennsylvania state senators
The Hill School alumni
Vanderbilt University alumni
1970s births
Year of birth uncertain
Living people